"Mrs. Robinson" is a song by American music duo Simon & Garfunkel from their fourth studio album, Bookends (1968). Written specifically for the 1967 film The Graduate, the song was released as a single on April 5, 1968, by Columbia Records. Produced by the duo and Roy Halee, the song was written by Paul Simon, who pitched it to movie director Mike Nichols alongside Art Garfunkel after Nichols rejected two other songs intended for the film. The Graduates soundtrack album uses two short versions of "Mrs. Robinson"; a full version was later included on Bookends. The song was additionally released on the Mrs. Robinson EP in 1968, which also included three other songs from the film: "April Come She Will", "Scarborough Fair/Canticle", and "The Sound of Silence".

"Mrs. Robinson" became the duo's second chart-topper, hitting  1 on the Billboard Hot 100, as well as peaking within the top 10 of the United Kingdom, Ireland, and Spain, among other countries. In 1969, it became the first rock song to win the Grammy Award for Record of the Year. The song contains a famous reference to baseball star Joe DiMaggio. The song has been covered by a number of artists, including Frank Sinatra, the Lemonheads, and Bon Jovi. In 2004, it finished at No. 6 on AFI's 100 Years...100 Songs survey of top tunes in American cinema.

Background
Simon & Garfunkel reached national fame in the United States in 1965–66, touring colleges and releasing a string of hit singles and albums. Meanwhile, director Mike Nichols, then filming The Graduate, became fascinated with two of the duo's songs, listening to them nonstop before and after filming. After two weeks of this obsession, he met with Columbia Records chairman Clive Davis to ask for permission to license Simon & Garfunkel music for his film. Davis viewed it as a perfect fit and envisioned a best-selling soundtrack album. Simon was not as immediately receptive, viewing movies as akin to "selling out", but he agreed to write at least one or two new songs for the film after being impressed by Nichols' wit and the script. Leonard Hirshan, a powerful agent at William Morris, negotiated a deal that paid Simon $25,000 to submit three songs to Nichols and producer Lawrence Turman.

Several weeks later, Simon re-emerged with two new tracks, "Punky's Dilemma" and "Overs", neither of which Nichols was particularly taken with. Nichols asked if the duo had any more songs to offer, and after a break from the meeting, they returned with an early version of "Mrs. Robinson". They had been working on a track titled "Mrs. Roosevelt", and returned to perform it for Nichols. He was ecstatic about the song, later commenting, "They filled in with dee de dee dee de dee dee dee because there was no verse yet, but I liked even that." Garfunkel later expanded upon the song's placement in The Graduate:

The film version employs a Bo Diddley beat, unlike the studio version. The final version of "Mrs. Robinson" was completed on February 2, 1968, at Columbia Studio A in New York City. The recording was released more than three months after the release of The Graduate, but through its numerous radio plays became an important cross-promotion of the film during its initial run in theaters. A louder and punchier bass drum is present on the promo mix, which was done to accommodate for the limited dynamic range produced by AM radio.

Cash Box called the single version a "booming-beat satire with the glittering vocals and unique lyric material that hallmark the duo's material."

Composition

Simon's inclusion of the phrase "coo-coo-ca-choo" is a homage to a lyric in the Beatles' "I Am the Walrus".

References in the last verse to Joe DiMaggio are perhaps the most discussed. Simon, a fan of Mickey Mantle, was asked during an intermission on The Dick Cavett Show why Mantle was not mentioned in the song instead of DiMaggio. Simon replied, "It's about syllables, Dick. It's about how many beats there are." Simon happened to meet DiMaggio at a New York City restaurant in the 1970s, and the two immediately discussed the song.  DiMaggio said "What I don't understand, is why you ask where I've gone. I just did a Mr. Coffee commercial, I'm a spokesman for the Bowery Savings Bank and I haven't gone anywhere!" Simon replied "that I didn't mean the lines literally, that I thought of him as an American hero and that genuine heroes were in short supply. He accepted the explanation and thanked me. We shook hands and said good night". In a New York Times op-ed in March 1999, shortly after DiMaggio's death, Simon discussed this meeting and explained that the line was meant as a sincere tribute to DiMaggio's unpretentious and modest heroic stature, in a time when popular culture magnifies and distorts how we perceive our heroes. He further reflected: "In these days of Presidential transgressions and apologies and prime-time interviews about private sexual matters, we grieve for Joe DiMaggio and mourn the loss of his grace and dignity, his fierce sense of privacy, his fidelity to the memory of his wife and the power of his silence". Simon subsequently performed "Mrs. Robinson" at Yankee Stadium in DiMaggio's honor shortly after his death in 1999 (leaving out the second verse).

Awards and nominations
"Mrs. Robinson" was awarded two Grammy Awards at the 11th Annual Grammy Awards in 1969. It became the first rock song to win Record of the Year (although the previous year's "Up Up and Away" by the 5th Dimension could also be considered a contender) and it also was awarded the Grammy for Best Contemporary-Pop Performance – Vocal Duo or Group. The duo were asked to perform the song live at the ceremony, but they declined. Instead, they shot a video for the show set to the music that consisted of them "romping around Yankee Stadium", a reference to the song's lyrics concerning DiMaggio. "Mrs. Robinson" was ineligible for the Academy Award for Best Original Song, as a nominee must have been written as a song exclusively for the film in which it appeared.

Personnel
 Paul Simon – acoustic guitars, vocals
 Art Garfunkel – vocals, percussion
 Hal Blaine – drums, congas
 Larry Knechtel – bass

Charts

Weekly charts

Year-end charts

Certifications

In popular culture

Writer/actor/director Albert Brooks licensed Paul Simon's music from Mrs. Robinson for his 1996 film Mother. Brooks and Monica Johnson wrote special lyrics for the song, which was recorded as "Mrs. Henderson", and referenced Brooks' character's mother. Voice actors Steve Lively and Jess Harnell provided sound-alike vocals, impersonating Simon & Garfunkel on the track, which was produced by Marc Shaiman, who also composed and produced the film's score.

The film Rumor Has It centers on the assumption that The Graduate is based on real events which become uncovered. The song "Mrs. Robinson" is featured in this film as well.

In early January 2010, after news of Iris Robinson (wife of Northern Ireland First Minister Peter Robinson) having an extramarital affair with the (40 years younger) adult child of a family friend became public, a group was set up on Facebook attempting to get the song "Mrs. Robinson" to No.1 in the Official UK Singles Chart for that week via download sales. It received coverage in The Telegraph and other British media, including coverage in gay-related publications because of the anti-gay principles of the Robinsons.

The song is included in Quentin Tarantino's 2019 film Once Upon a Time in Hollywood. It plays as an homage to The Graduate, in a scene in which Cliff Booth (Brad Pitt) spots the much younger Pussycat (Margaret Qualley). It also appears on the film's soundtrack.

Cover versions

Frank Sinatra version

One of the earliest well-known cover versions of this song was by Frank Sinatra for his 1969 album My Way. This version changes a number of lines, including replacing "Jesus" with "Jilly" and including a new verse directly referring to Mrs. Robinson's activities in The Graduate. Writing in The complete guide to the music of Paul Simon and Simon & Garfunkel, Chris Charlesworth writes that Sinatra's change was "senseless", motivated by the refusal of some radio stations to play the song because of the name "Jesus".

The Lemonheads version

American alternative rock band the Lemonheads recorded a punk-inflected cover version of this song in 1992 that made it to No. 18 on the US Billboard Bubbling Under Hot 100, No. 8 on Billboards Modern Rock Tracks chart, and the top 20 in Australia and New Zealand. In Ireland and the United Kingdom, where the song also reached the top 20, "Mrs. Robinson" was released as a double A-side with "Being Around". Although not originally included on the Lemonheads' album It's a Shame About Ray, the album was re-released with the cover of "Mrs. Robinson" included after the single's chart success.

The band's frontman, Evan Dando, later told American Songwriter that he "hated" the song as well as its author and that its recording was only to promote a 25th anniversary home video release of The Graduate. He noted that Simon greatly disliked the cover, but Garfunkel was more favorable toward it.

Charts

References

Bibliography

External links
 
 Paul Simon's tribute in the New York Times.

1967 songs
1968 singles
Billboard Hot 100 number-one singles
Cashbox number-one singles
Atlantic Records singles
Columbia Records singles
Reprise Records singles
Cultural depictions of Joe DiMaggio
Grammy Award for Record of the Year
Grammy Hall of Fame Award recipients
The Lemonheads songs
RPM Top Singles number-one singles
Sexuality and age in fiction
Simon & Garfunkel songs
Song recordings produced by Art Garfunkel
Song recordings produced by Paul Simon
Song recordings produced by Roy Halee
Songs written by Paul Simon
Songs written for films
Grunge songs